Royal Air Force Wanborough or more simply RAF Wanborough is a former Royal Air Force satellite airfield near Swindon, Wiltshire, England.

The following units were here at some point:
 No. 3 Elementary Flying Training School RAF
 No. 3 Glider Training School RAF
 No. 3 Service Flying Training School RAF
 No. 14 Service Flying Training School RAF
 No. 1547 (Beam Approach Training) Flight RAF
 Airfield Controllers School
 School of Flying Control

Current use

The site is now open land.

References

Wanborough